The International Audio Group (IAG) is a Chinese manufacturer of consumer and professional audio & HiFi components. It is based in Shenzhen in China.  It is owned and run by twin brothers Bernard and Michael Chang.

Products 
In the past the IAG purchased several British HiFi manufacturers:
Audiolab, Wharfedale, Quad Electroacoustics, Mission, Tag McLaren, and Castle Acoustics, Japanese brand Luxman, plus several Italian manufacturers of lighting equipment including f.a.l. and Coef. It has a manufacturing plant in Ji'an China employing 1500 people. Design of the products is done by Chinese and European designers.

IAG used to manufacture luxury yachts near Shenzhen, which was the biggest yacht yard in Southeast Asia.

External links 
 International Audio Group

Loudspeaker manufacturers
Companies based in Cambridgeshire
Audio equipment manufacturers of the United Kingdom